The Russian Embassy School in Berlin is a Russian international school in Berlin, Germany, serving up to secondary school.

See also
 Germany–Russia relations
 German School Moscow

References

External links
 Russian Embassy School in Berlin 

Berlin
International schools in Berlin
Germany–Russia relations